The Rașcuța is a right tributary of the river Râmna in the country of Romania. It flows into the Râmna near Cocoșari.

References

Rivers of Romania
Rivers of Vrancea County